Jim's Restaurants is an American chain of restaurants owned by Uptown San Antonio, Texas-based Frontier Enterprises. Jim's, most well known for its breakfast and charbroiled Frontier Burgers, was started in 1947 when founder G. Jim Hasslocher built his first burger stand.  The burger stand grew and became a drive-in burger concept with carhops, which eventually led to full-service restaurants in several locations. Prior to 1980, the restaurant chain expanded into the Houston metro area until Frontier withdrew and sold off the Houston locations. As of April 2010, Frontier operates 16 locations in the San Antonio area and 3 in Austin.

In San Antonio, Frontier Enterprises took over eight Shoney's locations in 1998 and later converted them to Jim's restaurants. Frontier also operated the Tower of the Americas' restaurant at HemisFair Park in Downtown San Antonio for more than three decades. In 2005, the City of San Antonio closed the Tower facility for remodeling and awarded the operating contract to another vendor.

Founder and chairman of the board, G. Jim Hasslocher, died on November 18, 2015, at the age of 93. He was active in the business until his death.

See also

 List of hamburger restaurants

References

External links

Frontier Enterprises official website 

Restaurants established in 1947
Hamburger restaurants
Regional restaurant chains in the United States
Restaurants in San Antonio
Drive-in restaurants
1947 establishments in Texas